Frédéric Johansen (13 October 1972 – 20 December 1998), was a French footballer.

Club career
Johansen was named player of the year for the Division 2 1991–92 season.

International career
Soucasse represented France at under-21 level on eight occasions in 1992.

Personal life and death
Frédéric was the brother of fellow professional footballer Pascal Johansen.

He was killed in a car accident in December 1992. His club, Mulhouse, named a stand after him in memory. The stand was closed in 2021, due to wood rot making it dangerous.

References

1972 births
1992 deaths
French footballers
France youth international footballers
Association football midfielders
Ligue 2 players
SR Colmar players
FC Mulhouse players
France under-21 international footballers
Sportspeople from Colmar
Road incident deaths in France